Glattpark is a large construction project in Switzerland that is taking shape in Opfikon, close to the border to Zürich. As part of the construction project a new neighbourhood will be built by 2020; it is designed to provide room for 7,000 residents and about the same number of jobs.

Some of the favourable locational factors used to market the area are the direct proximity to the city of Zürich, where similar construction projects are being realized in Oerlikon and Seebach. The large service companies based in the north of the city and other companies in Glattbrugg, Rümlang and at the airport promise a large number of potential jobs. One of the negative points is that the area is about two miles from the threshold of runway 34/16 of Zurich Airport and thus practically in the axis line of the runway. However, construction in the area is placing a strong emphasis on noise isolation of the buildings, with inhabitants reporting that the noise levels are not significant.

Headquarters 
The headquarters of  Kraft Foods Europe GmbH are located in Glattpark.

Park 
On the eastern side of the area an artificial lake has been created as well as a park area, called Opfikerpark. The artificial lake is 41 metres wide and 550 metres long and is safe to swim in, with sandy beaches having been included in the design. Bridges cross the lake at regular intervals to link the inhabited zone with the park.

Transport 
The neighbourhood is intended to have as little traffic as possible, most of the roads are therefore planned as pedestrian zones.

In addition to the Glattalbahn, which runs the length and breadth of the southern and western side of the neighbourhood, several bus lines linking it to public transport are under discussion. It is planned to have bus line 781 run through the neighbourhood on Boulevard Lilienthal as soon as this road has been completed. The nearby railway station Opfikon provides access to the Zürich S-Bahn network, the Glattalbahn forms a direct link to the train stations of Zürich Oerlikon, Glattbrugg and Stettbach.

On the western side, the four-lane Thurgauerstrasse leads to the intersection of Opfikon with the Highway A51 (airport motorway).

References 

 Glattpark webpage
 Neighbourhood Association Glattpark
 Time lapse of the project

Buildings and structures in the canton of Zürich
Opfikon